Claude Laurgeau (born November 1942) is a French professor in robotics. His primary interest is intelligent transportation systems.

He was a professor at the University of Nantes from 1975 to 1982, then director of the "Productive robotics research" department at the IT Agency from 1982 to 1987.

In 1989, he was appointed professor at École des Mines de Paris where he created the Robotics Research Center (CAOR) which he directed until February 2008. He officially retired at the end of 2010, while continuing to collaborate on research projects.

He has contributed to the creation of several robotics "start-up" companies, both at the IT Agency and at the École des mines.

He is president of the company Intempora which develops and publishes the software RTMaps.

Awards 
 Member of the Order of Academic Palms
 Member of the  National Order of Merit
 Grand Jury Prize at the 2004 Léonard Trophies
 Received the Engelberger Robotics Award in 2004

Books 
 Programmable automates Dunod, 1978
 The machines of vision - ETA, 1986
 Industrial automation - SCM, 1977
 Languages for Robotics - Hermès,
 Understanding Robotics - AFRI
 The century of the intelligent car - at Press of Mines ParisTech 2009

References 

Academic staff of the University of Nantes
Intelligent transportation systems
Roboticists
1942 births
Living people